Gothy Kendoll is the stage name of Samuel David Handley (born 19 June 1997), a drag queen, DJ and OnlyFans creator from Leicester. He is best known for his appearance on the first series of RuPaul's Drag Race UK and for appearing on the first series of the MTV series Celeb Ex in the City. He also released a single "Switch" in January 2021.

Early life and career
Samuel David Handley was born in Leicester, Leicestershire on 19 June 1997. He started performing in drag in 2016 and worked as a DJ at events and parties. In 2019, Gothy Kendoll was announced as one of the twelve contestants on the first series of RuPaul's Drag Race UK. Kendoll was the first to be eliminated from the competition after losing a lip sync performance of "New Rules" by Dua Lipa to Vinegar Strokes, making them the first contestant to be eliminated from the British version of the show. In 2020, Kendoll appeared as a cast member on the MTV reality series Celeb Ex in the City. In 2021, Kendoll released his debut single "Switch", which featured vocals from fellow RuPaul's Drag Race UK contestant Divina de Campo and Forbid. He is also a creator on OnlyFans, often collaborating with twinks to create pornographic content.

Filmography

Television

Discography

Singles

References

1997 births
Living people
20th-century LGBT people
21st-century LGBT people
English drag queens
Gay entertainers
OnlyFans creators
People from Leicester
RuPaul's Drag Race UK contestants